Redmi Pad is an Android tablet computer designed, marketed and manufactured by Xiaomi. This tablet computer was announced on October 4, 2022, it was released on October 5, 2022.

Design 
The tablet has glass front and aluminum unibody.

The design of the camera bump is similar to Redmi K50 and K50 Pro.

On the bottom side, there are USB-C and two speakers. On the top side, there are two speakers and a power button. On the right side there are a volume rocker, two microphones, and microSD tray.

Redmi Pad solds in 3 colours: Graphite Gray, Moonlight Silver, Mint Green.

References

External links 
 

Xiaomi
Tablet computers introduced in 2022
Tablet computers